Paliouria (Greek: Παλιουριά); (also called Paliurgia, Παλιουργιά), is a beach in the regional unit of Melivoia.

With the green of the forest coming down to the beach, with rocky complexes, creating a rare beauty, image. Especially the area of Koutsoupias recent years has developed enough in terms of tourism infrastructure.

References
Παλιουριά

Beaches of Greece
Populated places in Larissa (regional unit)
Landforms of Thessaly
Landforms of Larissa (regional unit)